John O'Banion (16 February 1947 – 14 February 2007) was an American vocalist and actor.

Early career
O'Banion was born in Kokomo, Indiana in 1947 and was performing in theater by the age of 13 as well as in a local Indiana band Hog Honda & the Chain Guards. By age 15, he hosted his own radio show on WIOU and had hosted his own local television show by age 20.

Recording and acting career
O'Banion was the lead singer in Doc Severinsen's band, Today's Children. He was managed by Bud Robinson, also Severinsen's manager. They parted ways in early 1974. O'Banion said that Johnny Carson was a big fan and supporter of his career. O'Banion made five appearances on Carson's Tonight Show, and as many on Merv Griffin's and Mike Douglas' shows. He also appeared on American Bandstand, Solid Gold, and was the winning singer of the pilot of Star Search.

His song "Love You Like I Never Loved Before" was a hit single in 1981, making it to No. 24 on the US Billboard Hot 100 chart, No. 32 in Canada and No. 51 in Australia. O'Banion won the prestigious Tokyo Music Festival Award in 1982, with "I Don't Want to Lose Your Love", later sung by Crystal Gayle on her 1983 album Cage the Songbird and achieving the No. 2 spot on Billboard'''s country chart. O'Banion also sang two songs for the Japanese period film Legend of the Eight Samurai; "I Don't Want This Night to End" and "White Light".

He also appeared in the films Borderline with Charles Bronson, TV film Courage with Sophia Loren and Billy Dee Williams and starred in the 1990 independent film The Judas Project''. In 1995, he released an album of jazz cover versions of contemporary hits such as "I'm Not in Love", "What You Won't Do for Love" and the title track "Hearts".

Death
Just two days before his 60th birthday, O'Banion died of blunt force trauma as a result of being hit by a car while touring in New Orleans, Louisiana. He died at his home in Los Angeles, California surrounded by friends and family. He had been battling the long-term effects received as a result of the trauma to the head following the incident in New Orleans.

Discography

Studio albums

See also
Joey Carbone

References

External links

1947 births
2007 deaths
Singers from Indiana
Road incident deaths in Louisiana
People from Kokomo, Indiana
Elektra Records artists
20th-century American singers
20th-century American male singers